Sefid Khani-ye Kuchek (also Romanized as Sefīd Khānī-ye Kūchek; also known as Sefīd Khānī) is a village in Itivand-e Jonubi Rural District, Kakavand District, Delfan County, Lorestan Province, Iran. At the 2006 census, its population was 112, in 21 families.

References 

Towns and villages in Delfan County